Padjaklubi (English: The Pillow Club) is an Estonian comedy series that airs on the TV channel TV3 in Estonia.

Written by Birk Rohelend, Martin Algus, Silvia Soro and others, it is the story of four young women with very different personalities, who hold very different worldviews, who end up having to live together, under one roof.

Cast 
Katariina Ratasepp – Maria
Kertu Moppel – Kristina
Grete Klein – Laura
Kristel Aaslaid – Misha

References

2010s Estonian television series
2014 television series debuts
2022 television series endings